Umar Nazir Mir (born 3 November 1993) is an Indian cricketer who plays for Jammu & Kashmir. In October 2018, he was named in India C's squad for the 2018–19 Deodhar Trophy.

References

External links
 

1993 births
Living people
Indian cricketers
Jammu and Kashmir cricketers
People from Pulwama